The 1974 Tour de Suisse was the 38th edition of the Tour de Suisse cycle race and was held from 13 June to 21 June 1974. The race started in Gippingen and finished in Olten. The race was won by Eddy Merckx of the Molteni team.

General classification

References

1974
Tour de Suisse
June 1974 sports events in Europe
1974 Super Prestige Pernod